The FINA World Junior Diving Championships is a diving championship event organized by FINA for boys and girls.

History
First held in 1977. Results:

Age groups (A and B):
 Group A for divers from 16 to 18 years old. 
 Group B for divers from 14 to 16 years old.

Editions

Medals

2006
16th Fina World Junior Diving Championships

23.08.2006-27.08.2006

ÜBERSICHT 	HOME

Platz	Land 	  	Gold 	Silber 	Bronze 	4. Platz 	5. Platz 	6. Platz

1. 	CHN 		9	8	3	1	 	1

2. 	UKR 		1	3	2	2	3	2

3. 	USA 		1	1	1	2	 	1

4. 	MAS 		1	 	1	 	2	 

5. 	JPN 		1	 	 	1	 	 

6. 	AUS 		1	 	 	 	1	 

7. 	CAN 		 	1	2	 	5	1

8. 	RUS 		 	1	 	5	2	3

9. 	GER 		 	 	2	1	 	2

10. 	MEX 		 	 	2	1	 	1

11. 	GBR 		 	 	1	1	 	1

12. 	ITA 		 	 	 	1	 	 

13. 	KOR 		 	 	 	 	1	 

14. 	VEN 		 	 	 	 	 	2

2008
17th FINA Junior Diving World Championships

16.09.2008-21.09.2008

ÜBERSICHT 	HOME

Platz	Land 	  	Gold 	Silber 	Bronze 	4. Platz 	5. Platz 	6. Platz

1. 	CHN 		13	6	4	 	2	 

2. 	RUS 		1	2	4	2	1	1

3. 	GBR 		 	2	 	3	 	 

4. 	USA 		 	2	 	1	3	2

5. 	CAN 		 	1	1	3	1	1

6. 	UKR 		 	1	 	1	2	3

7. 	AUS 		 	 	3	 	 	2

8. 	JPN 		 	 	1	1	1	 

9. 	GER 		 	 	1	 	 	2

10. 	MEX 		 	 	 	1	3	2

11. 	CUB 		 	 	 	1	1	 

12. 	MAS 		 	 	 	1	 	1

13. 	BLR 		 	 	 	 	 	1

2010
18th FINA Junior Diving World Championships

01.09.2010-06.09.2010

ÜBERSICHT 	HOME

Platz	Land 	  	Gold 	Silber 	Bronze 	4. Platz 	5. Platz 	6. Platz

1. 	CHN 		6	6	6	1	2	1

2. 	USA 		3	4	2	2	4	1

3. 	GBR 		2	 	 	1	 	2

4. 	MEX 		1	2	1	2	 	 

5. 	JPN 		1	 	1	1	1	 

6. 	RUS 		1	 	 	 	2	3

7. 	AUS 		 	2	 	2	1	2

8. 	UKR 		 	 	3	1	1	1

9. 	CAN 		 	 	1	1	1	1

10. 	ITA 		 	 	 	2	1	 

11. 	MAS 		 	 	 	1	 	 

12. 	GER 		 	 	 	 	1	1

13. 	COL 		 	 	 	 	 	1

13.   	NZL 		 	 	 	 	 	1

2012
19th FINA Junior Diving World Championships

08.10.2012-13.10.2012

ÜBERSICHT 	HOME

Platz	Land 	  	Gold 	Silber 	Bronze 	4. Platz 	5. Platz 	6. Platz

1. 	CHN 		10	10	2	2	2	 

2. 	GBR 		3	2	1	1	 	 

3. 	USA 		1	 	2	 	1	4

4. 	RUS 		 	2	2	 	6	1

5. 	AUS 		 	 	5	4	2	3

6. 	MEX 		 	 	1	3	 	1

7. 	COL 		 	 	1	1	 	3

8. 	UKR 		 	 	 	1	1	2

9. 	ITA 		 	 	 	1	 	 

9.  	CAN 		 	 	 	1	 	 

11. 	JPN 		 	 	 	 	1	 

11.  	MAS 		 	 	 	 	1

2014

2016

2018

2021

See also
 FINA World Junior Swimming Championships
 FINA World Junior Synchronised Swimming Championships
 FINA Junior Water Polo World Championships
 FINA World Junior Open Water Swimming Championships
 FINA Diving Grand Prix (https://fr.wikipedia.org/wiki/Grand_Prix_FINA_de_plongeon)

References

International diving competitions
Diving